Skandi Neptune is an Offshore Construction Vessel that was operated by Subsea 7 from 2005 until the charter was ended in 2015.

History
The Skandi Neptune was built in 2001 as a cable layer. In 2005, she was converted to a multi-purpose offshore support vessel and began a long term charter to Subsea 7.

In 2010, Skandi Neptune provided ROV capability during the oil spill following an explosion on the Deepwater Horizon in the Gulf of Mexico.

Layout
Skandi Neptune has two stern azimuth thrusters, a retractable forward azimuth thruster and two bow tunnel thrusters. Combined with a class 2 DGPS system, these provide excellent manoeuvring capabilities.

She has accommodation for 106 persons in single and double cabins. The helideck is rated for Super Puma L2s.

The stern A-Frame is rated at 60 tonne SWL, the deck crane at 250 tonne SWL. The moon pool and 130 tonne traction winch allow the installation of flexible pipe.

Service
Skandi Neptune can operate as a pipe-laying ship and provides ROV support.

Footnotes

Ships built in Romania
Merchant ships of Norway
Pipe-laying ships
Cable laying ships
2000 ships